Nizhny Tsasuchey is a rural locality (a selo) and the administrative center of Ononsky District of Zabaykalsky Krai, Russia. Population:

Geography
The village is about 245 km southeast of the regional capital Chita. It is on the right bank of the Onon River. The Ononsky Museum of Local History is located here.

History
Nizhny Tsasuchey was founded as a border outpost in 1727. By 1923, there was a three-year parochial school, a veterinary post, a  nunnery, a bakery, and a horse farm. In 1927, the Komsomol cell was founded. Until the 1990s, the airport operated.

References

Rural localities in Zabaykalsky Krai